Chelsea Court is a private housing estate in Yeung Uk Road, Tsuen Wan, New Territories, Hong Kong, which was developed by Sun Hung Kai Properties in 2005. Formerly Swire Cola Factory, it has two towers of 45 and 54 floors, offering 1,624 serviced apartments, overlooking the Tai Mo Shan and Rambler Channel.

Like nearby Nina Tower, Vision City and Indi Home, Chelsea Court is a high-rise building estate.

Demographics
According to the 2016 by-census, Chelsea Court had a population of 4,273. The median age was 36.4 and the majority of residents (91.6 per cent) were of Chinese ethnicity. The average household size was 2.8 people. The median monthly household income of all households (i.e. including both economically active and inactive households) was HK$50,000.

Politics
Chelsea Court is located in Tsuen Wan South constituency of the Tsuen Wan District Council. It is currently represented by Antonio Luk Ling-chung, who was elected in the 2019 elections.

See also
Nina Tower
Vision City
Indi Home

References

External links
Official website of Chelsea Court
Unofficial forum for Chelsea Court(爵悅庭人社區網)

 

Residential skyscrapers in Hong Kong
Buildings and structures completed in 2005
Tsuen Wan District
Private housing estates in Hong Kong
Sun Hung Kai Properties
Twin towers